Vladyslav Mykolayovych Semotyuk (born 14 November 2000) is a Ukrainian football player. He plays for Kryvbas Kryvyi Rih.

Club career
He made his Ukrainian Premier League debut for FC Arsenal Kyiv on 30 September 2018 in a game against FC Dynamo Kyiv.

References

External links
 

2000 births
Living people
Sportspeople from Ivano-Frankivsk
Ukrainian footballers
Association football forwards
FC Stal Kamianske players
FC Arsenal Kyiv players
FC Prykarpattia Ivano-Frankivsk (1998) players
FC Kryvbas Kryvyi Rih players
Ukrainian Premier League players
Ukrainian First League players